Sunderland Association Football Club was founded in 1880  as Sunderland & District Teachers Association Football Club by James Allan. They turned professional in 1885. Sunderland won their first Football League championship in the 1891–92 season two years after joining the league. They won the next Football League First Division on three occasions in four seasons; in 1892, 1893 and 1895, separated by a runner-up spot in 1894. In the 1901–02 season, Sunderland won their fifth Football League First Division championship. They came close to completing the "league and cup double" in the 1912–13 season, winning the league but losing to Aston Villa in the 1913 FA Cup Final. The team's next success came in the 1935–36 season when they won the League Championship and also the Charity Shield. They had not won the FA Cup until the 1936–37 season when they defeated Preston North End in the 1937 FA Cup Final. Sunderland entered The Football League in 1890 and were not relegated from the top division until the 1957–58 season; a total of 58 seasons in the highest division of England. Their next trophy came in the 1973 FA Cup Final as they beat Leeds United 1–0. They reached the 1985 Football League Cup Final but finished as runners-up to Norwich City after being beaten 1–0. In the 1986–87 season Sunderland were relegated to the Football League Third Division for the first time in their history under the management of Lawrie McMenemy, they however, returned to the second division the following season as champions–their lowest position in the English football league system until 2019. Their first appearance in the Premier League came in the 1996–97 season after being promoted as champions from Division One. They were relegated after a single campaign but won promotion as Champions again in the 1998/99 season acquiring 105 points on the way, a second tier record at the time. Sunderland gained just 15 points in the 2005–06 season, which set the record for the lowest number of points in a top flight season for 3 points for a win, which has since been eclipsed by Derby County.

Sunderland have won the League Championship six times, the FA Cup twice, and the Charity Shield three times (including the Sheriff of London Charity Shield). They have been runners-up in the League Championship five times, in the FA Cup twice and in the League Cup twice. In European competitions, Sunderland have reached the second round stage of the UEFA Cup Winners' Cup. The table details the club's achievements in all national and European first-team competitions, and records their top league goalscorer, for each completed season.

Key

Key to league record:
 Pld = Matches played
 W = Matches won
 D = Matches drawn
 L = Matches lost
 GF = Goals for
 GA = Goals against
 Pts = Points
 Pos = Final position

Key to divisions:
 FL = Football League
 Div 1 = Football League First Division
 Div 2 = Football League Second Division
 Div 3 = Football League Third Division
 Prem = Premier League
 Chmp = Championship
 One = League One
 n/a = Not applicable

Key to rounds:
 DNE = Did not enter
 Disq = Disqualified
 QR = Qualifying round
 Grp = Group stage
 R1 = Round 1
 R2 = Round 2
 R3 = Round 3
 R4 = Round 4
 R5 = Round 5

 QF = Quarter-finals
 SF = Semi-finals
 AQF = Area quarter-finals
 ASF = Area semi-finals
 AF = Area final
 RU = Runners-up
 WS = Shared
 W = Winners

Divisions in bold indicate a change in division.
Players in bold indicate the top scorer in the division that season.
Players in  italics  indicate the top scorer in Europe that season.

Seasons

Overall
 Seasons spent at Level 1 of the football league system: 87
 Seasons spent at Level 2 of the football league system: 31
 Seasons spent at Level 3 of the football league system: 5
 Seasons spent at Level 4 of the football league system: 0
(Including current season)

Footnotes

References
General
 
 All statistics for seasons are retrieved from individual seasons pages, and top scorers, from appearances section on their individual season page. 

Specific

Seasons
 
Sunderland A.F.C.